The Vale class was a class of five Rendel (or "flat-iron") gunboats built for the Royal Norwegian Navy between 1874 and 1878. Small, nimble vessels, they were armed with a single large calibre muzzle-loading gun for offensive purposes and several small, quick firing guns for self-defence.

Service history
Shortly before the First World War, the five vessels were rebuilt as minelayers. During this rebuild, the heavy muzzle-loading gun was replaced with a more modern 12 cm breech-loader, and on Nor and Vidar one of the 37 mm guns was replaced with a more potent 47 mm gun. Since the heavy gun and ammunition was removed, these diminutive vessels could carry a useful number of mines.

All vessels were kept in service until the German invasion in 1940 and with the exception of Uller, which was sunk by the Royal Norwegian Navy Air Service after capture by the Germans, they all spent the remainder of the war in German hands.

After the Second World War the vessels were returned to the Royal Norwegian Navy, and scrapped over the course of the next few years.

Ships

References

 Naval history via Flix: KNM Vale, retrieved 27 February 2006
 Byggenummer ved Horten verft, retrieved 27 February 2006
 Ships of the Norwegian navy, retrieved 27 February 2006

Gunboat classes
Mine warfare vessel classes